Karin Thürig (born 4 July 1972 in Rothenburg) is a Swiss professional racing cyclist and triathlete. She is the winner of the 2004 and 2005 UCI Road World Championships – Women's time trial. In 2011, she took second at the Ironman 70.3 World Championship.

Palmarès

Cycling

 2001
 2nd, Individual time trial, National Road Championships

 2002
 3rd, Individual time trial, World Road Championships
 1st, Individual time trial, National Road Championships

 2003
 2003 Track World Cup
 1st, Pursuit, Cape Town

 2004
 2004 Track World Cup
 1st, Pursuit, Moscow
 2nd, Pursuit, Sydney
 1st, Individual time trial, National Road Championships
 1st, Stage 1, Thüringen-Rundfahrt der Frauen
 3rd, Individual time trial, Olympic Games, Athens
 1st Chrono Champenois-Trophée Européen
 1st, Individual time trial, World Road Championships

 2005
 2004–2005 Track World Cup
 3rd, Pursuit, Manchester
 3rd, Pursuit, Track World Championships, Los Angeles
 1st, Souvenir Magali Pache
 Tour de l'Aude Cycliste Féminin
 1st, Stage 5
 1st, Stage 8
 1st, Individual time trial, National Road Championships
 1st, Individual time trial, World Road Championships

 2006
 1st, Individual time trial, National Road Championships
 1st, L'Heure D'Or Féminine / The Ladies Golden Hour (with Nicole Cooke, Priska Doppmann, Christiane Soeder and Joanne Kiesanowski)
 1st, Chrono Champenois-Trophée Européen
 2nd, Individual time trial, World Road Championships

 2007
 3rd, Souvenir Magali Pache
 Grande Boucle Féminine Internationale
 1st, Stage 1
 2nd, Stage 3b
 1st, Individual time trial, National Road Championships
 2nd, Open de Suède Vårgårda
 1st, Memorial Davide Fardelli – Cronometro Individuale
 1st, 2007 Chrono Champenois – Trophée Européen
 2007–2008 Track World Cup
 3rd, Pursuit, Sydney

 2008
 3rd, Individual Time Trial, Olympic Games, Beijing
 1st, 2008 Chrono Champenois – Trophée Européen

Multisport

Triathlon
 1st, Ironman France 2002
 1st, Ironman Zürich 2005
 1st, Ironman Lanzarote 2006
 1st, Ironman 70.3 Monaco 2006
 2nd, Ironman 70.3 Switzerland 2007
 1st, Ironman Zürich 2010
 1st, Ironman 70.3 Austria 2011
 1st, Ironman 70.3 European Championship 2011
 2nd, Ironman 70.3 World Championship 2011

Duathlon
 World champion, long distance: 2001, 2002
 Swiss champion: 2001, 2002, 2003
 Overall World Cup champion: 2001, 2002

External links 

1972 births
Living people
People from Hochdorf District
Swiss female cyclists
Swiss female triathletes
Swiss track cyclists
Cyclists at the 2004 Summer Olympics
Cyclists at the 2008 Summer Olympics
Olympic bronze medalists for Switzerland
Olympic cyclists of Switzerland
UCI Road World Champions (women)
Duathletes
Olympic medalists in cycling
Medalists at the 2008 Summer Olympics
Medalists at the 2004 Summer Olympics
Sportspeople from the canton of Lucerne